Patrik Lukáč (born 5 December 1994) is a Slovak professional footballer who currently plays for Fortuna Liga club ViOn Zlaté Moravce as a goalkeeper.

Club career

FC Slovan Liberec
He made his professional Gambrinus Liga debut for Slovan Liberec against Vysočina Jihlava on 23 May 2015.

References

External links
 
 Futbalnet profile 
 Eurofotbal profile 

1994 births
Living people
Sportspeople from Prešov
Slovak footballers
Slovak expatriate footballers
Slovakia youth international footballers
Association football goalkeepers
FK Teplice players
FC Slovan Liberec players
FK Senica players
FK Železiarne Podbrezová players
1. FC Tatran Prešov players
Elana Toruń players
FC ViOn Zlaté Moravce players
Czech First League players
Slovak Super Liga players
2. Liga (Slovakia) players
Expatriate footballers in the Czech Republic
Slovak expatriate sportspeople in the Czech Republic
Expatriate footballers in Poland
Slovak expatriate sportspeople in Poland